The Labour Party was a populist political party in Argentina.

History
The party was founded by Peronist trade union leaders at the end of October 1945. The party organization was built up around the Peronist unions, and most of its representatives in different elected offices had been recruited from the ranks of the trade union movements. The party was led by an Organizing Committee with 52 members. The party had little structure of its own, and its popularity was mainly dependent on being identified with Juan Perón. Luis Gay, of the telephone workers union, was the general secretary of the party. Another prominent trade union leader taking part in the founding of the party was Cipriano Reyes (a leader of the meat-packers union). Reyes became vice president of the party. The party published El Laborista.

Just a few months before the founding of the party, the British Labour Party had won a resounding election victory. The Argentinian party name was borrowed from the British party, and the Argentinian party organization was modelled after its British counterpart (with unions as an integral party organization).

The presidential and parliamentary elections held in February 1946 resulted in a major success for the Labour Party. The party was responsible for mobilizing most of the votes for Juan Perón. It also gained a majority in both chambers of parliament. The party maintained a stance of critical support to the government of Perón. The party called for nationalizations, social welfare, women's suffrage and land reform. Moreover, the party criticized limitations on the freedom of the press. Perón kept a certain distance from the Labour Party, favouring Radicals and dissident conservatives for the most important positions.

In mid-1946 Perón ordered that the three parties that had supported his candidacy be dissolved into a unity party, Partido Único de la Revolución. The laboristas initially rejected the idea of a merger into the unity party (which in 1947 was renamed  the Peronist Party). However, in July 1947 it decided to dissolve itself and called on its members to join the Peronist Party as its 'labour nucleus'. After the Labour Party had been disbanded, its former leaders (such as Reyes) suffered from government repression.

Following the Revolución Libertadora, in 1957 Cipriano Reyes refounded the party. It participated in the 1957 Argentine Constitutional Assembly election, as well as elections in 1960, 1963, and 1965, before being dissolved again.

See also
Justicialist Party
Peronism
Trade unionism
Trade unions in Argentina

References

 Defunct political parties in Argentina
 History of Argentina (1943–1955)
 Justicialist Party
 Labour parties
 Peronist parties and alliances in Argentina
 Political parties established in 1945
 Political parties disestablished in 1947
 1945 establishments in Argentina